KDC may refer to:
 Kurt Donald Cobain (1967-1994), American songwriter
 Korean decimal classification, a system of library classification 
 Key distribution center, part of a cryptosystem
 Kandi Airport, IATA code
 Karainagar Divisional Council, a Sri Lanka local authority